Paul Gibbins (born 3 January 1953) is a British biathlete. He competed at the 1976 Winter Olympics and the 1980 Winter Olympics.

References

1953 births
Living people
British male biathletes
British male cross-country skiers
Olympic biathletes of Great Britain
Olympic cross-country skiers of Great Britain
Biathletes at the 1976 Winter Olympics
Biathletes at the 1980 Winter Olympics
Cross-country skiers at the 1976 Winter Olympics
Sportspeople from Leicester
20th-century British people
21st-century British people